A Broomstick is the stick of a broom.

Broomstick or Broomsticks may also refer to: 

 Broomstick (horse), a racehorse

In music 
 Broom, Broomstick or Brush, a type of percussion mallet
 "Broomstick", a song on the B-side of a version of Paul McCartney's Flaming Pie album

In christian mythology and fiction
A broom, when described as a means of transport for witches and others who perform magic, is often called a broomstick.
As such, it is what one rides on during a game of Quidditch.
 The Three Broomsticks, a fictional restaurant in the Harry Potter universe
 formed after the fictional restaurant, The Three Broomsticks is a real restaurant in the Orlando The Wizarding World of Harry Potter themepark